Cameron Glenn (born March 12, 1996) is an American defensive back for the Toronto Argonauts of the Canadian Football League (CFL). He played college football at Wake Forest.

College career
After graduating from Stephenson High School in Stone Mountain, Georgia, Glenn chose to play college football at Wake Forest University. After redshirting his freshman season in 2014, Glenn went on to play in 42 games over the next four years, in which he intercepted four passes, forced four fumbles, and made 269 tackles, 11.5 of which were for a loss. 

Glenn graduated with a degree in Communication and Media Studies.

College statistics

Professional career

San Francisco 49ers
After going unselected in 2019 NFL Draft, Glenn was signed by the San Francisco 49ers as an undrafted free agent on April 27, 2019.  On May 15, Glenn was released by the team.

Toronto Argonauts
On October 22, 2019, Glenn was signed by the Toronto Argonauts to their practice roster. Glenn saw action in the team’s penultimate game that week against the Ottawa Redblacks.

References

External links
 Wake Forest bio
 Toronto Argonauts bio

1996 births
Living people
Wake Forest Demon Deacons football players
Canadian football defensive backs
San Francisco 49ers players
Toronto Argonauts players
American players of Canadian football